Minuscule 228 (in the Gregory-Aland numbering), δ 458 (Soden), is a Greek minuscule manuscript of the New Testament, on parchment. Palaeographically it has been assigned to the 14th century. Formerly it was labelled by 109a and 229p.

Description 

The codex contains the text of the Acts of the Apostles and Pauline epistles (except Philemon, Hebrews), on 126 parchment leaves (size ). It is written in one column per page, 40-44 lines per page. It has not Catholic epistles.

Text 
Hermann von Soden classified it to the textual family Kx. Aland did not place it in any of his Categories.

According to the Claremont Profile Method it represents the textual family Π171 in Luke 1 and Luke 10. In Luke 20 it represents Kx.

It does not contain the Pericope Adulterae (John 7:53-8:11).

History 

The manuscript belonged to Nicholas Nathanael of Crete, then to Andreas Darmarius, a calligrapher from Epidaurus. Daniel Gotthilf Moldenhawer collated it for Andreas Birch (Esc. 7). Formerly the manuscript was labelled by 109a and 229p. In 1908 C. R. Gregory gave the number 228 to it.

It is currently housed at the Escurial (Cod. Escurialensis, X. IV. 12).

See also 

 List of New Testament minuscules
 Biblical manuscript
 Textual criticism

References

Further reading 

 Emmanuel Miller, Catalogue des manuscrits grecs de la bibliothèque de l'Escurial (Paris 1848), p. 405.
 

Greek New Testament minuscules
14th-century biblical manuscripts